Maia Miminoshvili (born 1 August 1960), is a Georgian physicist and politician, Minister of Education and Science between 2007 and 2008 in the cabinet of Lado Gurgenidze.

Born in Tbilisi, she got a degree in Mechanics and Maths for the Tbilisi State University in 1988.

On 2008 was named director of the National Assessment & Examinations Center until 28 May 2012, when Minister Dimitri Shashkini fired her. When Georgian Dream came to the power in the 2012 parliamentary election, Miminoshvili was renamed director of the NAEC until was dismissed again on 10 September 2018- by Education Minister Mikheil Batiashvili.

References

1960 births
Living people
Government ministers of Georgia (country)
Women government ministers of Georgia (country)
Education in Georgia (country)
Physicists from Georgia (country)
21st-century women politicians from Georgia (country)
21st-century politicians from Georgia (country)
Scientists from Tbilisi
Tbilisi State University alumni
Politicians from Tbilisi